Avadan is a village in Tarsus  district of Mersin Province, Turkey. At    it is situated in Çukurova (Cilicia of the antiquity) plains to the north of Çukurova motorway . The population of Avadan is 293  as of 2012. According to village page, the village was founded in the early years of the 19th century. Main economic activity is farming. Fruits like citrus, grapes, apricots etc. are the main crops.

References

Villages in Tarsus District